Campiglossa guttella is a species of tephritid or fruit flies in the genus Campiglossa of the family Tephritidae.

Distribution
The species is found in Norway, France, Switzerland, Austria, Italy, Bulgaria, Ukraine.

References

Tephritinae
Insects described in 1870
Diptera of Europe
Taxa named by Camillo Rondani